The 2017 season was the New England Patriots' 48th in the National Football League (NFL), their 58th overall and their 18th under head coach Bill Belichick.

The Patriots entered the season as the defending champions of Super Bowl LI. They failed to match their 14–2 record from last season with their Week 14 loss to the Miami Dolphins. Despite that, in Week 15, the Patriots secured their 9th consecutive AFC East title, their 15th of the last 17 seasons, with their victory over the Pittsburgh Steelers. With their win over the Buffalo Bills in week 16, the Patriots obtained their 8th consecutive 12-or-more win season stretching all the way from 2010, an NFL record. Their Week 17 victory over the New York Jets clinched their top seed in the AFC for the second straight year, thus giving the Patriots home-field advantage throughout the entire AFC playoffs for the second year in a row.

The Patriots defeated the Tennessee Titans in the Divisional Round 35–14, and the Jacksonville Jaguars in the AFC Championship Game 24–20, claiming their second consecutive AFC title. This was their seventh consecutive AFC Championship appearance, adding onto their record from the previous year. The win also made Tom Brady the oldest quarterback (40 years, 163 days) to win a playoff game, surpassing Brett Favre for the record. It was also the second time they advanced to the Super Bowl two consecutive seasons, the first being 2004. They faced the Philadelphia Eagles in a rematch of Super Bowl XXXIX. This also made the Patriots the only team in NFL history to appear in ten Super Bowls, and gave the Patriots a chance to repeat as Super Bowl Champions for the second time in franchise history, and for the first time since 2004. In addition, they had the chance to tie the Pittsburgh Steelers for the record of most Super Bowl wins by a team in NFL history with 6. However, due to a late strip-sack of Brady by Brandon Graham and a failed Hail Mary pass, the Eagles defeated the Patriots in Super Bowl LII by 41–33, ending the Patriots chance at a sixth Super Bowl title and resulting in their first Super Bowl loss since 2011. The loss prevented the Patriots from repeating their three-in-four Super Bowl run that they managed from 2001 to 2004. Also with the loss, the Patriots tied the NFL record for most Super Bowl losses with five, and made them the fifth defending Super Bowl champion to lose the next year's game, after the 1978 Dallas Cowboys, the 1983 Washington Redskins, the 1997 Green Bay Packers and the 2014 Seattle Seahawks.

Coaching changes

Departures
February 20: Long time Patriots coach, Brian Daboll, was named as the offensive coordinator for the University of Alabama football team after serving as the Patriots tight ends coach for three years.

Promotions
February 27: After serving as a Patriots coaching assistant for 2 years, Nick Caley was named as the Patriots tight ends coach, replacing former Patriots tight ends coach Brian Daboll for the job.

Roster changes

Free agents

Unrestricted

Restricted

Exclusive-Rights

Signings

Departures

Trades
 March 8: The Patriots obtained tight end Dwayne Allen and a sixth-round selection and sent a fourth-round selection to the Indianapolis Colts.
 March 10: The Patriots were involved in a trade in which they sent their second-round selection to the Carolina Panthers for defensive end Kony Ealy and a third-round selection.
 March 10: The Patriots were involved in a trade in which they sent their first-round selection and a third-round selection to the New Orleans Saints for wide receiver Brandin Cooks and a fourth-round selection.
 April 29: The Patriots traded a fifth-round selection to the Kansas City Chiefs for tight end James O'Shaughnessy and a sixth-round selection.
 August 29: The Patriots traded a 2018 seventh-round selection to the Cincinnati Bengals for linebacker Marquis Flowers.
 September 1: The Patriots traded cornerback Justin Coleman to the Seattle Seahawks for a 2018 seventh-round draft selection.
 September 2: The Patriots traded a 2019 sixth-round selection to the Detroit Lions for cornerback Johnson Bademosi.
 September 2: The Patriots traded quarterback Jacoby Brissett to the Indianapolis Colts for wide receiver Phillip Dorsett.
 September 2: The Patriots traded their 2018 fifth and seventh-round picks to the Seahawks for defensive end Cassius Marsh.
October 30: The Patriots traded quarterback Jimmy Garoppolo to the San Francisco 49ers for a 2018 second-round selection.

Draft

Notes
The fourth-round selection that the Patriots obtained from the trade with the New Orleans Saints would have been No. 118 overall; however, it was forfeited as part of the punishment for the Deflategate scandal.
 The patriots were awarded an additional fifth-round compensatory selection – No. 183 overall.
 The patriots gave up a fifth-round selection – No. 163 overall – to the Buffalo Bills when they signed restricted free agent Mike Gillislee to an offer sheet.
 As a result of their trades, the Patriots did not use any of their assigned selections, and drafted just four players—the lowest number in franchise history.

Undrafted free agents

Suspensions
Tight end Rob Gronkowski was suspended for one game (Week 14) for intentionally falling on cornerback Tre'Davious White while White was on the ground during Week 13 against the Buffalo Bills.

Injuries
September 2: Wide Receiver Julian Edelman was placed on injured reserve after suffering a torn ACL in the week 3 preseason matchup against the Detroit Lions. It was confirmed that he would be out for the entire season.
September 2: Cornerback Cyrus Jones was placed on injured reserve after sustaining a torn ACL and meniscus during the week 4 preseason matchup against the New York Giants. He would be out for the entire season.
September 2: Defensive end Derek Rivers tore his ACL and sprained his LCL during a joint-practice with the Houston Texans in August.
September 4: Outside linebacker Shea McClellin was placed on injured reserve after being out since early preseason. He will be ineligible to return until week 8.
September 22: Defensive tackle Vincent Valentine was placed on injured reserve due to a knee injury that kept him out of practice throughout the season.
November 7: Linebacker Dont'a Hightower suffered an injury on his right shoulder pectoral muscle during the second half of the game against the Atlanta Falcons.
November 27: Safety/Special teamer Nate Ebner suffered a knee injury during a fake punt against the Miami Dolphins.
November 27: Tight end Martellus Bennett was placed on injured reserve after having both a shoulder and a hamstring injury.
December 13: Offensive tackle Marcus Cannon who was out since October 29 due to an ankle injury, was placed on injured reserve.
January 17: Cornerback Jonathan Jones suffered an ankle injury in the Patriots' divisional-round game against the Tennessee Titans and was placed on injured reserved.

Staff

Rosters

Opening training camp
As of the Patriots' first training camp practice at Gillette Stadium on July 27, they had the NFL maximum of 90 players signed.

Week 1

Final

Preseason

Regular season

Schedule

Note: Intra-division opponents are in bold text.

Game summaries

Week 1: vs. Kansas City Chiefs
NFL Kickoff Game

The Patriots started their season at home on Thursday, September 7 as the defending Super Bowl champion. They would strike first in the first quarter when Mike Gillislee ran for a 2-yard touchdown for a 7–0 lead. The Chiefs however tied it later on in the quarter at 7–7 when Alex Smith found Demetrius Harris on a 7-yard pass. In the second quarter, the Pats moved ahead by double digits as Stephen Gostkowski kicked a 25-yard field goal followed up by Gillislee running for another 2-yard touchdown to make the score 10–7 and increased it to 17–7. The Chiefs came within 3 before halftime when Smith found Kareem Hunt on a 3-yard pass for a 17–14 game.

In the third quarter, the Chiefs took the lead as Smith found Tyreek Hill on a 75-yard pass to make it 21–17. Though the Pats moved back into the lead when Gillislee ran for a 1-yard touchdown to make it 24–21. They then closed out the quarter with a 27–21 lead when Gostowski kicked a 32-yard field goal. In the fourth quarter, it was all Chiefs. It all started with Smith finding Hunt again this time on a 78-yard pass to retake the lead 28–27. This was followed by Hunt's 4-yard run for a touchdown to make it 35–27. Finally, they closed the scoring of the game with Charcandrick West's 21-yard run for a touchdown for the final score of 42–27.

This game was the Chiefs' first win in Foxborough since 1990. Additionally, the Patriots defense allowed 537 total yards which is the most yardage ever given up by a Bill Belichick team during a single game as the Patriots began 0–1 for the first time since 2014.

Week 2: at New Orleans Saints

The Patriots rebounded from their opening week loss by establishing an early insurmountable lead against the New Orleans Saints in their week 2 matchup for their first visit to Mercedes-Benz Superdome since the Saints' Super Bowl winning 2009 season. Brandin Cooks returned to the Bayou while the controversy for the Saints was around backs Adrian Peterson and Mark Ingram II competing for touches. (Alvin Kamara, who would go on to win 2017 NFL Offensive Rookie of the Year, was not yet getting significant playing time in week 2.) Peterson would later be shipped to the Cardinals in an ironic turn of events for Chris Johnson. Tom Brady completed three first-quarter touchdown passes to Rex Burkhead, Rob Gronkowski, and Chris Hogan. The three touchdowns marked a personal record for Brady, who had never in his career had so many scores in the first quarter of any game. Mike Gillislee added a running touchdown in the second quarter, and the Patriots played a conservative second half to seal the 36–20 victory. This would be the only home loss the Saints would have this season. Grownkowski injured his groin in the third quarter, causing him to leave the game.

Week 3: vs. Houston Texans

The week 3 matchup vs. the Texans proved to be a greater challenge for the Patriots than the Saints had been in week 2. The Patriots scored first on a 7-play drive ending with a Tom Brady 5-yard throw to Rob Gronkowski, who was playing with a groin injury that took him out of the previous week's game. The game would progress through seven lead changes, as Texans rookie quarterback Deshaun Watson would go drive-for-drive against Brady. Watson threw two touchdowns, one of which to his tight end Ryan Griffin, who attended college in New England at UConn. Two field goals late in the game would give the Texans their final lead at 33–28. With less than 2:25 remaining in the game, Brady led the Patriots on a frantic 8-play 71-yard drive that culminated in a 25-yard reception by Brandin Cooks to give the Patriots the 36–33 win.

Week 4: vs. Carolina Panthers

The Patriots' third game at home this season was their second loss of the season. Tom Brady's attempted comeback in the fourth quarter was not enough to beat Cam Newton and the Panthers as Carolina upset New England 33–30 with a last second 48-yard field goal courtesy of Graham Gano. At the end of Week 4, the Patriots' defense was ranked last in the entire NFL. In this rematch of Super Bowl XXXVIII, this was the second consecutive time, after the 2013 season, that the Pats lost a heartbreaker to Cam Newton. This was the last time the Patriots lost a home game until Week 14 of 2019.

With the loss, the Pats fell to 2–2. Brady's record against the Panthers overall also fell to 2–3.

Week 5: at Tampa Bay Buccaneers

For the first time since 2009, the Patriots wore an all-white ensemble for this game, against the Buccaneers. For the first time this season, the Patriots were held to just a single touchdown on offense. Buccaneers place kicker Nick Folk missed all three field goal attempts in this game, which proved fatal to any chance they had at a comeback. After the conclusion of Week 5, the Patriots claimed a share in a three-way tie for the division lead. Star tight-end Rob Gronkowski did not play in the game, after being listed on the injury report for suffering from a thigh injury suffered at practice the previous day.

Week 6: at New York Jets

Another interesting chapter was added to the Patriots-Jets rivalry at MetLife. With this victory over the Jets, quarterback Tom Brady earned his 187th regular season win. Brady surpassed Brett Favre and Peyton Manning as the NFL's sole all-time leader in regular season wins. While missing two key components of their defensive secondary, the Patriots were able to overcome a two touchdown deficit in the first half and were able to hold on to secure the victory on a final drive surge from the Jets. Star tight end Rob Gronkowski made his return to the lineup, and contributed two touchdowns as well as several other key catches in the victory. This game also marked the first time since Week 1 that Brady did not throw for 300 yards.

During this game, in the 4th quarter, a controversial play caused a Jets touchdown to be reversed by official review when it was found that Jets tight end Austin Seferian-Jenkins juggled the ball after being hit, resulting in a fumble, and didn't regain control until he was out of bounds which, by rule, is enforced as a turnover and a touchback.

Week 7: vs. Atlanta Falcons

For the first time since Week 3 of last season, the Patriots wore their all-blue Color Rush uniforms, for this Super Bowl LI rematch. The Patriots defense, for the first time this season, were able to hold an opposing quarterback under 300 passing yards, with Matt Ryan only logging 233. The defense also made key stops, including blocking a field goal, stopping the Falcons in the red zone resulting in a missed field goal, and stopping Atlanta on a 4th down attempt from the 1-yard line. During the game, an extremely dense fog covered the stadium for most of the contest, resulting in the television broadcast being forced to use their on-field cameras much more than normal. As the Chiefs had lost to Oakland on Thursday Night Football, the Patriots' win against the Falcons moved them into a three-way tie for the best record in the AFC with the Chiefs and Steelers.

Week 8: vs. Los Angeles Chargers

In their last game before the bye week, the Patriots took on the Los Angeles Chargers at home. The teams traded punts on the opening two possessions. The Chargers scored first on an 87-yard run by Melvin Gordon, matching a 56-year old Chargers record. With the next drive, the Patriots scored on a 2-yard pass to Rob Gronkowski at the start of the second quarter. Later in the second quarter, the Chargers returner Travis Benjamin caught a Ryan Allen punt at his own 8-yard line and ran backwards into his own endzone in an attempt to evade the Patriots coverage team. The resulting safety by Brandon King gave the Patriots their first lead at 9–7, and the Patriots would never trail again, kicking four field goals, and holding off a late-game surge by the Chargers to preserve a 21–13 win.

The game was notable for the performances by Patriots running backs. Heavy rain slowed down the long passing game, so short passes to the running backs dominated the Patriots offensive game plan. Running backs James White and Rex Burkhead led the Patriots in receiving with 85 yards and 68 yards respectively, mostly on yards after catch. Fellow running back Dion Lewis led the Patriots in ground yardage for the fourth straight week, with Mike Gillislee also contributing to key short-yardage situations. The Patriots entered the bye week at 6–2, a position almost nobody expected before or after week four.

A few days after this, the Patriots sent backup QB Jimmy Garoppolo to the San Francisco 49ers for a second-round draft pick. Garoppolo led the 49ers to five consecutive wins after replacing C. J. Beathard.

Week 10: at Denver Broncos

The Patriots usually play very well coming off of a bye week and 2017 was no exception. The Patriots opened the game with a 3-and-out, but on the ensuing punt, Denver returner Isaiah McKenzie muffed the return, and it was recovered by the Patriots. Brady capitalized quickly, as two quick completions to Rex Burkhead gave the Pats the lead at 12:43 in the first quarter, a lead they would not relinquish. The Broncos answered with a field goal, and on the ensuing kickoff, Pats special teams came through again with a Dion Lewis kick return for a touchdown. The Broncos added a second field goal in the first quarter, while the Patriots responded with one of their own at the start of the second quarter. The Broncos next drive stalled out short of midfield, and Burkhead found a hole in the line to block the Riley Dixon punt, once again giving the Patriots good field position. The Patriots and Broncos traded field goals, and the Patriots closed out the first half with a Brady-to-Dwayne Allen touchdown, his first reception of the season. The Broncos only sustained touchdown drive came at the start of the second half, ending in a Brock Osweiler-to-Demaryius Thomas seven-yard pass. Two more touchdowns by the Patriots (a run by Lewis and a reception by James White) would seal the deal, with Brady taking a rest at the end of the game to give new acquisition Brian Hoyer some game-time reps.

For his performance, Brady was named the AFC Offensive Player of the Week, his third this season and the 30th of his career. In addition, running back Dion Lewis also earned honors, receiving the AFC Special Teams Player of the Week award.

Week 11: at Oakland Raiders
NFL International Series

Tom Brady became the first player to pass for 300 yards in three different countries: USA, Mexico, and the United Kingdom.

Week 12: vs. Miami Dolphins

Week 13: at Buffalo Bills

Rob Gronkowski was suspended for one game after a late hit on Bills defensive back Tre'Davious White.

Week 14: at Miami Dolphins

The Pats' 14-game road win streak ended in Miami, the same place where they suffered their last regular season road loss on January 3, 2016. Rob Gronkowski missed this game due to suspension.

Week 15: at Pittsburgh Steelers

The return of Rob Gronkowski, and a late-game interception resulted in the Patriots defeating the Steelers. The Pats won the AFC East for the 9th straight year. The Patriots trailed 24–16 at the end of the third quarter. They scored on a 46-yard field goal with 4:00 left in the game to pull within 24–19. Then, with 56 seconds remaining, Dion Lewis scored on an 8-yard run and the Patriots added a two-point conversion to go ahead 27–24.

JuJu Smith-Schuster set the Steelers up deep in Patriots territory with a 69-yard reception from Ben Roethlisberger. It looked like Pittsburgh regained the lead on a 10-yard touchdown pass from Roethlisberger to tight end Jesse James. However, the play was overturned and the Steelers couldn't find the end zone. The game ended on a Roethlisberger interception.  With this win, the Patriots improved to 11–3 and clinched the AFC East division title for the 9th consecutive season.

Steelers wide receiver Antonio Brown left in the first half with a bruised calf. He was taken to the hospital and didn't return.

Week 16: vs. Buffalo Bills

Tom Brady passed for a pair of touchdowns and the New England Patriots stayed on track to claim home-field advantage throughout the AFC playoffs with a 37–16 win over the Buffalo Bills on Sunday and also with the Jacksonville Jaguars losing late in the day, the Patriots clinched a first round bye for the 8th consecutive season.

Dion Lewis caught a touchdown pass and rushed for a 4-yard score. He carried 24 times for career-high 129 yards. It was just his second-career 100-yard game. Mike Gillislee (former Bill himself), active for the first time in six games, added a 1-yard rushing touchdown.

Week 17: vs. New York Jets

With the win, the New England Patriots gained the #1 seed and home-field advantage throughout the entire AFC playoffs for the second year in a row.

Standings

Division

Conference

Postseason

AFC Divisional Playoffs: vs. (5) Tennessee Titans

The Patriots set a club playoff record by sacking Marcus Mariota eight times for their second win in three career playoff matches with the Titans franchise. The Patriots held Titans RB Derrick Henry to only 28 yards on 12 carries the week after he went for 156 yds against the Chiefs. This marked the third playoff meeting between the two clubs, the first since 2003, with the Patriots now holding a 2–1 advantage. They split the first two meetings, both in the Divisional round, including the first game against the Titans' predecessor, the Houston Oilers.

AFC Championship: vs. (3) Jacksonville Jaguars

This marked the fifth playoff meeting between the two clubs with the Patriots now holding a 4–1 advantage. This was their second meeting in the AFC Championship Game, the Patriots winning in 1996 as well.

The Pats overall record improved to 15–3.

Super Bowl LII: vs. (N1) Philadelphia Eagles

With this loss, the Patriots were unable to defend their Super Bowl title from last year. The team finished the season with an overall record of 15–4. However, the 33 points scored is the most ever by a team that lost the Super Bowl. Tom Brady is also the first QB ever to throw for over 500 yards and lose the Super Bowl. His personal Super Bowl record dropped to 5–3. His record against the NFC East in Super Bowls also dropped to 1–3.

The Patriots, however, became the first team to appear in and play in 10 Super Bowls.  But, despite the fact that they are still tied with the Cowboys and 49ers for 5 franchise wins, this loss tied them with the Broncos for most Super Bowls lost, with 5.

Statistics

Team leaders

League rankings

Awards and honors

References

External links
 
2017 New England Patriots season at ESPN
2017 New England Patriots season at Pro Football Reference

New England Patriots
New England Patriots seasons
New England Patriots
AFC East championship seasons
American Football Conference championship seasons
Sports competitions in Foxborough, Massachusetts